Yosvani Ramos (born Yosvani Sabdiel Ramos Fontes on 23 June 1979) is a Cuban ballet dancer. He danced with the English National Ballet for nine years, five as a principal dancer, before joining The Australian Ballet as a principal artist in January 2008, where he remained until April 2013. He joined Cincinnati Ballet as a principal dancer in August 2014 where he remained until the end of that season - May 2015. He is currently contracted to Colorado Ballet in Denver as a principal dancer, having commenced in August 2015.

Early life and training 
Ramos was born to Juan Ramos Barba and Gisela Fontes Lopez in Camagüey, Cuba. He studied dance at the Vocational School of Arts there from 1989, and in 1994 won the gold medal at the Vignale Festival of Dance. He was then admitted to study ballet at the Cuban National Ballet School under the direction of Ramona de Sáa, graduating in 1997.

Professional ballet career 
In September 1997 Ramos joined the Jeune Ballet de France, a French touring company. Started by Robert Berthier with the assistance of Rosella Hightower, the dancers trained for three months and toured for nine - a Professional Year type of training. Ramos remained with the company for two years, leaving in April 1999 for the Paris Opera Ballet. He performed Nureyev's Swan Lake as a surnuméraire (extra member of the corps de ballet).

Ramos was invited to join English National Ballet as a soloist in August 1999 by Derek Deane, and was promoted to senior soloist in 2000, then principal in 2003 after a performance of Coppélia at the Sadler's Wells Theatre.

The Australian Ballet had only two male principals at the end of 2007, and artistic director David McAllister invited Ramos to join the company as a principal artist from February 2008. He also had many opportunities to perform as a guest artist outside Australia, frequently taking The Australian Ballet's Leanne Stojmenov as his partner. Ramos left The Australian Ballet in April 2013.

After leaving The Australian Ballet, Ramos danced around the world on a freelance basis. He debuted as James in La Sylphide with Bangkok City Ballet in Thailand in July 2013 and also performed at the 18th International Ballet Festival in Miami in September 2013.

He spent the 2014-15 season with Cincinnati Ballet as a principal dancer, then joined Colorado Ballet as a principal dancer for the 2015-16 season. 

He remained in Denver for the 2016-17 season, but during rehearsals for "The Nutcracker" in November 2016, tore an Achilles tendon. By June 2017, after surgery and intensive rehabilitation, he was back in the studio, anticipating a return to the stage early in the 2017-18 season. Ramos duly returned to the stage in Dracula in October 2017.

Ten years after leaving English National Ballet, Ramos worked with his former artistic director Derek Deane again, reprising the role of Romeo in Deane's Romeo and Juliet, which Deane set on Colorado Ballet.

In addition to freelancing for a time, Ramos has performed as a guest with companies including Staatstheater Wiesbaden (Germany), HNK Split Ballet (Croatia), Teatro Massimo Vittorio Emanuele (Palermo, Italy), Compañía Nacional de Danza (Mexico), and Ballet de Monterrey (Mexico).

Awards 
 1994 : Gold Medal Vignale Danza in Italy
 1995 : Grand Prix and Best Couple with Anette Delgado, International Ballet Festival of Havana, Cuba
 1995 : Gold Medal, Bento Dance, Brazil
 1995 : Grand Prix, International Ballet Competition, Montevideo, Uruguay
 1996 : Silver Medal (junior male), Best Couple (junior) with Anette Delgado, Varna International Ballet Competition, Bulgaria
 1998 : Gold Medal, Joinville Dance Festival, Brazil
 1998 : Silver Medal (junior male), USA International Ballet Competition, Jackson, Mississippi
 1998 : Gold Medal (junior male), Paris International Dance Competition
 1999 : Silver Medal (senior division, classical ballet, male), Nagoya International Ballet Competition, Japan.

Companies and roles 
After graduating from the Cuban national school, Ramos toured with the Jeune Ballet de France, both domestically and internationally - Africa, South America, and St Petersburg, Russia. The company performed classical excerpts and commissioned contemporary works. Ramos' roles included pas de deux from La Fille mal Gardée, Harlequinade, Le Corsaire, Flower Festival at Genzano, The Flames of Paris, Stars and Stripes, Don Quixote, and Variations for Four.

As a surnuméraire (short term contract corps de ballet member) with Paris Opera Ballet, Ramos danced in Nureyev's Swan Lake.

English National Ballet 
At the invitation of Derek Deane, Ramos joined English National Ballet as a soloist, eventually being promoted to principal in 2003. Roles with ENB included:
 Franz in Coppélia
 Prince, Nutcracker Doll in The Nutcracker
 Poet in Les Sylphides
 Blue Bird in The Sleeping Beauty
 lead man, Mazurka in Études
 Albrecht, peasant pas de deux in Giselle
 lead man in Balanchine's Who Cares?
 lead man in Balanchine's Square Dance 
 Jean de Brienne in grand pas from Raymonda
 pas de deux from Le Corsaire
 Romeo, Mercutio in Nureyev's Romeo and Juliet
 Romeo, Mercutio, Benvolio in Deane's arena Romeo and Juliet
 Siegfried in Swan Lake
 White Rabbit in Alice in Wonderland
 Prince in Cinderella
 Kay (created role) in The Snow Queen
 Drink To Me Only With Thine Eyes (Mark Morris)

The Australian Ballet 
Invited to join the company as a principal, Ramos expanded his repertoire to include
 Prince Siegfried in Graeme Murphy's Swan Lake
 Des Grieux in Macmillan's Manon 
 Doctor/Beloved Officer in Graeme Murphy's Nutcracker: The Story of Clara
 Basilio in Gaisina's Don Quixote
 Basilio in Nureyev's Don Quixote 
 Prince in Peter Wright's The Nutcracker
 Prince Désiré in Stanton Welch's The Sleeping Beauty
 Camille in Hynd's The Merry Widow
 Mercutio in Murphy's Romeo and Juliet
 Goro in Stanton Welch's Madame Butterfly
 Benno in Stephen Baynes' Swan Lake
 Red Knight in de Valois' Checkmate
 Lead man in Balanchine's Ballet Imperial
 Mazurka in Lifar's Suite en Blanc
 Welch's Divergence
 Petrushka in Fokine's Petrushka
 Principal man in Baynes' Beyond Bach
 Massine's Les Présages
 Macmillan's Concerto (first movement)
 Duato's Por vos muero
 Ratmansky's Scuola di ballo

and continued to dance
 Franz in Coppélia
 Albrecht in Giselle
 The Poet in Les Sylphides

May 2013 until August 2014
After his last performance as Basilio in Rudolf Nureyev's Don Quixote with The Australian Ballet on April 24, 2013, Ramos spent some time dancing freelance all over the world.

He made his debut as James in August Bournonville's La Sylphíde with Bangkok City Ballet in Thailand in July 2013, danced Giselle second act pas de deux and Lizzie MacKenzie's Adherence.Process at the International Ballet Festival in Miami, USA in September 2013, guested as the Prince in The Nutcracker with various companies in the USA in December 2013 and performed in ballet galas in London, Cork, Denver and Vienna as well as teaching in England and the USA.

Cincinnati Ballet 2014-2015 season
 Floating Forward (Heather Britt)
 Peter Pan in Septime Webre's Peter Pan
 Cotton Candy Cavalier, Poodle in The Nutcracker (Victoria Morgan)
 The Joker in ALICE (in Wonderland) (Septime Webre)
 Mozart's Requiem (Adam Hougland)
 Two Soloists in Yuri Possokhov's Classical Symphony

Colorado Ballet
Don Quixote pas de deux (Marius Petipa)
James in Bournonville's La Sylphíde
Jonathan Harker in Michael Pink's Dracula
Romeo in Derek Deane's Romeo and Juliet
Nutcracker Prince and the Sugar Plum Cavalier in Martin Fredmann's The Nutcracker
Principal couple in his own short ballet Divertimento Pour Six
The Dodo Bird, the Joker, Lewis Carroll, and the Mad Hatter in ALICE (in Wonderland) (Septime Webre)
Pas de Six in Dominic Walsh's Wolfgang (for Webb)
The Devil (El Diablo) in Lorita Travaglia's The Angel of Buenos Aires
Prince Siegfried and Benno in Swan Lake (Amanda McKerrow and John Gardner after Marius Petipa)
Prince Désiré in Sleeping Beauty (Petipa)
Blue couple in Brief Fling (Twyla Tharp)
Professor Marvel, The Wizard, Guard With Green Whiskers in The Wizard of Oz (Septime Webre)
Male Dark Angel in Serenade (Balanchine)
Estuans Interius in Carmina Burana (Fernand Nault)

Television and film performances 
The Poet in Les Sylphides, included in The Australian Ballet's triple bill Firebird and Other Legends.

References

External links

Anette Delgado and Yosvani Ramos in Varna competition gala 1996
Bio as Principal Artist at The Australian Ballet
Life as a travelling dancer
Dance Informa article on The Australian Ballet's Principal Artists
Appointment as Principal Artist with The Australian Ballet

1979 births
Living people
Cuban male ballet dancers
English National Ballet
The Australian Ballet